The 2013 Kent State Golden Flashes football team represented Kent State University in the 2013 NCAA Division I FBS football season. They were led by first-year head coach Paul Haynes and played their home games at Dix Stadium as a member of the East Division of the Mid-American Conference. They finished the season 4–8, 3–5 in MAC play to finish in fifth place in the East Division.

Schedule

Source: Schedule

Game summaries

Liberty

Sources:

Bowling Green

Sources:

LSU

Sources:

Penn State

Sources:

Western Michigan

Sources:

Northern Illinois

Sources:

Ball State

Sources:

South Alabama

Sources:

Buffalo

Sources:

Akron

Sources:

Miami [OH]

Sources:

Ohio

Sources:

References

Kent State
Kent State Golden Flashes football seasons
Kent State Golden Flashes football